Lithosarctia y-albulum is a moth of the family Erebidae. It was described by Charles Oberthür in 1886. It is found in China (Sichuan, Qinghai).

References

 

Spilosomina
Moths described in 1886
Moths of Asia